Betti Gertrud Käthe Hilda Coppi ( Rake; 30 May 1909 – 5 August 1943), known as Hilde Coppi, was a German communist and resistance fighter against the Nazi regime. She was a member of the anti-fascist resistance group that was later called the Red Orchestra by the Abwehr, during the Nazi period.

Life 

Betti Gertrud Käthe Hilda Rake was born in Berlin, and grew up in Mitte area of Berlin. Her mother ran a small leather shop. After finishing vocational school, she worked as a general practitioner's assistant through much of the 1930s.

Career
Coppi was working in Berlin as a clerk at the Reich Insurance Institute for Clerical Workers when she got to know Hans Coppi, who had only just been released from prison. By 1933, Rake had contact with members of the Communist Party of Germany (KPD).

Resistance
Together, Hilde and Hans Coppi — who wed on 14 June 1941 — hid persecution victims of the Nazi régime. During the war, Hilde Coppi listened to "Voice of Russia" (ie Radio Moscow) and shared the information broadcast over the radio with the Red Orchestra and other resistance groups. She also relayed greetings and any other signs of continued life heard on Radio Moscow from German prisoners of war to their kin. This was especially important, as Nazi propaganda had it that Soviet troops shot their enemies out of hand, and did not take prisoners. Moreover, she busied herself by broadcasting her group's messages through leaflets and stickers. She conducted a sticker campaign against the Nazis' anti-Soviet propaganda exhibition called The Soviet Paradise.

Arrest
Coppi and her husband were both arrested on 12 September 1942, along with Hans' parents and brother, and Hilde's mother. Hilde was pregnant by this time, later giving birth to the couple's son at the Barnimstrasse women's prison on 27 November. On 22 December 1942, her husband was put to death, and Hilde, too, was sentenced to death in the new year, on 20 January. A petition for clemency was made in her case in July, but Hitler refused to grant it. The execution was delayed until August, so that she could nurse her child, Hans. On 5 August 1943, Hilde Coppi was beheaded at Plötzensee Prison in Berlin seven months after her husband.

After the end of the war, her son was raised by her husband parent's, Freda and Robert Coppi, in the Garden colony Am Waldessaum. In 1950, the family moved to Karlshorst.

Literature 
 Gilles Perrault: Auf den Spuren der Roten Kapelle. Rowohlt 1994.
 Rosiejka, Gert: Die Rote Kapelle. „Landesverrat“ als antifaschistischer Widerstand. – Mit einer Einführung von Heinrich Scheel. ergebnisse, Hamburg 1986, .
 Peter Weiss setzte Hans und Hilde Coppi in seinem autobiographischen Roman [Die Ästhetik des Widerstands (1975–1981) ein literarisches Denkmal.
 Elfriede Brüning: … damit Du weiterlebst. Neues Leben, Berlin 1949, über die Geburt von Hans Coppi junior. Nemesis – Sozialistisches Archiv für Belletristik
 von Gélieu, Claudia: Frauen in Haft – Gefängnis Barnimstraße; eine Justizgeschichte. Elefanten-Press, Berlin 1994, . (Nachdruck: Frauen in Haft. Gefängnis Barnimstraße. Eine Justizgeschichte. Espresso-Verlag)

Awards and honours
 In the autobiographical novel, The Aesthetics of Resistance (1975-1981), German author Peter Weiss offers a portrayal a literary monument, in honour of the Coppi's.

Gallery

See also
 Zentralfriedhof Friedrichsfelde The Socialist Memorial

References

External links 
Biography (in German)

1909 births
1943 deaths
Executed people from Berlin
Red Orchestra (espionage)
Communists in the German Resistance
People condemned by Nazi courts
People executed by guillotine at Plötzensee Prison
People from Berlin executed at Plötzensee Prison
Executed German women
German spies for the Soviet Union
People executed for treason against Germany